Matt Zoller Seitz (born December 26, 1968) is an American film and television critic, author and film-maker.

Career
Matt Zoller Seitz is editor-at-large at RogerEbert.com, and the television critic for New York magazine and Vulture.com, as well as a member of
the George Foster Peabody Awards board of jurors. He was previously a television critic at Salon.com and The Newark Star Ledger, and a film critic for The New York Times. Prior to this he was a regular media columnist for the Dallas Observer. He founded the film and media criticism blog The House Next Door. Seitz is known as a leader in the creation of video essays, frequently featured on Moving Image Source and The L Magazine, and served as the publisher of PressPlay, a site for video-based film and television criticism. He was a finalist for the 1994 Pulitzer Prize for Criticism.

Seitz's second book, The Wes Anderson Collection, was published by Abrams Books in 2013. In February 2015, The Wes Anderson Collection: The Grand Budapest Hotel was published by Abrams Books. The Wes Anderson Collection was praised for its design and layout, which was intended to suggest the look and feel of an Anderson film and suggest that the reader was being taken on a tour of the filmmaker's imagination. "This book is the future," wrote Michael Sicinski in Cineaste. Mad Men Carousel: The Complete Critical Companion written by Seitz and with illustrations by Max Dalton was published by Abrams Books in November 2015. His latest book, The Press Gang, co-written with Godfrey Cheshire and Armond White and published by Seven Stories Press in 2020, is a compilation of Seitz's long-form film criticism written in the alternative weekly New York Press during the late 1990s and early 2000s.

He wrote, directed, and edited the feature film Home (2005).

Personal life
Seitz grew up mostly in Dallas. He is the son of jazz pianist David Zoller (1941–2020). He was married to Jennifer Dawson from 1994 until her death on April 27, 2006. They had two children, Hannah and James Seitz. Seitz married his second wife, Nancy Dawson, who was his first wife's sister and the ex-wife of his brother Rich, in February 2017. They divided their time between Bay Ridge, Brooklyn and Cincinnati. Nancy Dawson died of cancer on April 27, 2020, and his father died in November of that year.

Bibliography
Brad Pitt (1996)
The Wes Anderson Collection (2013)
The Wes Anderson Collection: The Grand Budapest Hotel (2015)
Mad Men Carousel: The Complete Critical Companion (2015)
TV (The Book): Two Experts Pick the Greatest American Shows of All Time (2016), Matt Zoller Seitz and Alan Sepinwall
The Oliver Stone Experience (2016)
Guillermo del Toro's The Devil's Backbone (2017), Matt Zoller Seitz and Simon Abrams
The Sopranos Sessions (2019), Matt Zoller Seitz and Alan Sepinwall
The Deadwood Bible: A Lie Agreed Upon (2022)

References

External links

1968 births
20th-century American male writers
20th-century American non-fiction writers
21st-century American male writers
21st-century American non-fiction writers
American bloggers
American columnists
American film critics
American male bloggers
American male screenwriters
American online publication editors
American television critics
Film directors from New York City
Film directors from Texas
Living people
New York (magazine) people
New York (state) Democrats 
People from Bay Ridge, Brooklyn
Salon (website) people
Screenwriters from New York (state)
Screenwriters from Texas
Southern Methodist University alumni
Writers from Brooklyn
Writers from Cincinnati
Writers from Dallas